Ederson is a given name. Notable people with the name include the following footballers:

 Ederson (footballer, born January 1986), Brazilian midfielder born in January 1986 (Lyon, Lazio, Flamengo)
 Ederson (footballer, born March 1986), Brazilian defensive midfielder born in March 1986 (Genk, Charleroi, Asteras Tripoli)
 Éderson (footballer, born 1989), Brazilian striker born in 1989 (Atlético Paranaense, Kashiwa Reysol)
 Ederson (footballer, born 1993), Brazilian goalkeeper born in 1993 (Manchester City)
 Éderson (footballer, born 1999), Brazilian defensive midfielder born in 1999 (Desportivo Brasil, Cruzeiro)
 Eder (footballer, born 1989), also known as Ederson Bruno Domingos, Brazilian winger born in 1989 (Yokohama)
 Ederson Fofonka, Brazilian forward born in 1974 (Uruguay, Mexico, Greece)
 Eder (footballer, born 1984), also known as Ederson Trindade Lopes, Brazilian forward born 1984 (Brazil, Japan)

See also
 Éder (given name)